Chișinău International Airport  is Moldova's main international airport, located  southeast of the centre of Chișinău, the capital city. It serves as headquarters for Air Moldova, the country's national airline. The IATA airport code KIV is derived from Kishinev (the Russian and former English name of the city).

History

Early years
The first scheduled flights to Chișinău started on 24 June 1926, on the route Bucharest–Galați–Chișinău and Iași. The flights were operated by CFRNA, later LARES. A commemorative plaque, describing the first flight to Chișinău, was placed in the airport.
 
The main terminal was built in the 1970s, with a capacity of 1,200,000 passengers per year.

Development since the 1990s

On 31 May 1995, Chișinău Airport was awarded the status of an international airport.

In 2002, following works by the Turkish company Akfen Holding, the airport was modernised. The project covered the construction of  curtain walls,  composite panels,  asphalt road, a treatment plant with a capacity of  a day, complete mechanical heating, ventilation and electrical systems, along with the X-ray security, luggage handling, master clock, and flight information systems. The annual capacity of the airport had increased to 5.4 million passengers.

Chișinău International Airport is a member of Airports Council International.

The airport closed temporarily on the 24th of February 2022, as Moldovan airspace was closed in the wake of the Russian invasion of Ukraine. As of 05 May 2022, the airport has reopened.

Future plans
There are plans to enlarge the airport.
The project involves a €19 million loan to Chișinău International Airport for the rehabilitation and upgrade of the existing runway, taxiways, aprons, and ramps, engineering works, safety equipment and other connected core assets of Chișinău International Airport. The European Investment Bank ('EIB') is considering co-financing alongside the EBRD for up to an equal amount.

Facilities
There were ten check-in desks and five gates at the airport in 2009. VIP and CIP guests are offered special services at the VIP terminal. A visitors' terrace on the second floor opened in December 2006.

Previously passengers had to present their passport, ticket and their registration (of foreigners – which used to be required). Passengers were allowed in the check-in hall. With the introduction of e-tickets and the abolition of the registration for foreigners, the airport reorganised in late 2006. This resulted in a bigger check-in hall and customs control is now after check-in.

Towards the end of 2017, plans for a second runway were unveiled. This runway would take the place of the current taxiway just north of the existing runway. The project began in early 2017. Runway 09–27 started operations on 13 September 2018.

Airlines and destinations
On 22 March 2022, the Civil Aviation Authority of Moldova partially reopened the country's airspace after being closed since 24 February 2022 after growing concerns amid the 2022 Russian invasion of Ukraine. Regular operations have since resumed at Chișinău Airport. The following airlines offer regular scheduled and charter flights at Chișinău International Airport. In 14 March 2023 WizzAir has suspended from Moldovan Air space due to  concerns over airspace safety. The move, effective from March 14, comes as tensions have been mounting in Moldova amid claims Russia's aggression against neighboring Ukraine is spilling over the border. Wizz Air’s website no longer shows flights to Chisinau and Wizz Air route Map featured on there website shows Wizz Air no longer fly to Moldova.

Statistics

Traffic

Routes

Other facilities
 The Civil Aviation Authority has its headquarters on the airport property.

Ground transportation

There are bus and trolleybus lines and rutierele frequently departing from the airport (aerogara). Rutieră line 165 passes through the Botanica district and continues to the city center. The 'AEROGARA' bus departs from Piața D. Cantemir and has intermediate stops in the city center on Stefan Cel Mare street. It also stops at the central railway station 'GARA' bus station. 

A trolleybus with the route 30 operates with a 20-minute interval from June 2017. A single-ride ticket costs 6 MDL, which is 0.31 EUR or 0.31 USD as of September 2022. This is different from rutierele, which may stop at any time, given the driver is notified a few seconds prior. The nearest railway station is Revaca.

See also
Civil Aviation Administration of Moldova
List of airports in Moldova
List of the busiest airports in the former USSR

References

External links

 
 State Administration of Civil Aviation Administration of Moldova

Airports in Moldova
Airport
airport